Events in the year 2021 in Jordan.

Incumbents
 King – Abdullah II 
 Prime Minister – Bisher Al-Khasawneh

Events
Ongoing — COVID-19 pandemic in Jordan
3 April - 2021 alleged Jordanian coup d'état attempt

Deaths
 

11 January – Yousef Ghawanmeh, historian and anthropologist (born 1935).
28 February – Aqel Biltaji, politician (born 1941).

References

 

 
Jordan